Stanley Smith Hughes (29 October 1918 – 5 January 2001) was raised in Tioga County, Pennsylvania. He joined the Marines in 1940 as an enlisted man and at the start of World War II was selected for officer training. He was assigned as a weapons platoon commander in the First Marine Division. He served in World War II, Korea and Vietnam. In Vietnam as the commander of the First Marine Regiment he conducted the relief operation of the Khe Sanh Combat Base and was in command during the heaviest fighting at the Battle of Hue. He was the only Marine to have been awarded the Navy Cross in both World War II and Vietnam.

Award citations

Navy Cross
The President of the United States of America takes pleasure in presenting the Navy Cross to First Lieutenant Stanley Smith Hughes (MCSN: 0-12654), United States Marine Corps Reserve, for extraordinary heroism as Commanding Officer of a machine gun platoon attached to a company of the Third Battalion, Seventh Marines, First Marine Division, in action against enemy Japanese forces at Cape Gloucester, New Britain, on 4 January 1944. When the advance of his company was stopped on the banks of a stream by a withering hail of enemy machine-gun fire from the opposite side which killed the leaders of both assault platoons and inflicted heavy casualties, First Lieutenant Hughes unhesitatingly exposed himself to the relentless hostile fire and, rallying the remnants of the platoons, courageously led them across the stream where they remained isolated in a precarious position. He then braved the enemy fire alone to re-cross the stream in an attempt to bring up reinforcements but, finding none available, rejoined his men, carrying them food. By his valiant leadership, First Lieutenant Hughes inspired his men to tremendous effort and enabled them to provide effective cover for other units subsequently making the hazardous crossing. His selfless courage and indomitable fighting spirit contributed materially to the complete destruction of the enemy defenses and were in keeping with the highest traditions of the United States Naval Service.
General Orders: SPOT AWARD, Commander, 7th Fleet: Serial 0689 (SofN Signed 14 September 1944)
Action Date: 4 January 1944
Service: Marine Corps
Rank: First Lieutenant
Battalion: 3d Battalion
Regiment: 7th Marines
Division: 1st Marine Division.

Navy Cross
The President of the United States of America takes pleasure in presenting a Gold Star in lieu of a Second Award of the Navy Cross to Colonel Stanley Smith Hughes (MCSN: 0-12654), United States Marine Corps Reserve, for extraordinary heroism while serving as Commanding Officer of the First Marines, First Marine Division (Reinforced), Fleet Marine Force, in connection with operations against the enemy in the Republic of Vietnam on 3 February 1968. During Operation HUE CITY, Colonel Hughes displaced his command post from Phu Bai to Hue along National Route One through enemy controlled territory. Undaunted by the heavy volume of hostile fire around him as he entered the besieged city, he rapidly moved his men along the fire-swept streets to reach the Military Assistance Command, Vietnam Compound. Moving to a vantage point on a roof top, he directed accurate counter-mortar and sniper fire, effectively suppressing the hostile fire in the area. He then maneuvered two battalions in an aggressive assault against the enemy, repeatedly disregarding his own safety to move to the areas of heaviest fighting to advise his commanders, encourage his men and personally request and direct support arms fire. When the First Battalion, Fifth Marines was attached to his regiment during heavy fighting, he fearlessly crossed the footbridge over the Perfume River under heavy fire, joining the command group at the Citadel to brief the unit commanders of the tactical situation and remain abreast of the battalion's progress. He repeatedly traveled across dangerously exposed areas to ensure the availability and uninterrupted distribution of vital supply items and equipment to his units. By his bold initiative, intrepid fighting spirit and superior tactical skill, Colonel Hughes was instrumental in the defeat and annihilation of a numerically superior enemy force, thereby reflecting great credit upon himself and the Marine Corps and upholding the highest traditions of the United States Naval Service.
General Orders: Authority: Navy Department Board of Decorations and Medals
Action Date: 3 February 1968
Service: Marine Corps
Rank: Colonel
Company: Commanding Officer
Regiment: 1st Marines
Division: 1st Marine Division (Rein.) FMF.

Silver Star
The President of the United States of America takes pleasure in presenting the Silver Star to Captain Stanley Smith Hughes (MCSN: 0-12654), United States Marine Corps Reserve, for conspicuous gallantry and intrepidity as Commanding Officer of Company K, Third Battalion, Seventh Marines, First Marine Division, in action against enemy Japanese forces during the assault on enemy-held Peleliu, Palau Islands, 16 September 1944. After he landed in the assault and established a beachhead on the previous day against strong hostile opposition, Captain Hughes vigorously continued to push the attack until all remaining enemy forces in his zone of action were driven across a sand spit and onto a small peninsula upon which they prepared a last-ditch defense from heavily fortified positions. While directing the reduction of the hostile positions which commanded the sand spit, he frequently exposed himself to enemy fire and, although wounded in the shoulder, refused to be evacuated and continued to press the attack until all remaining Japanese in that zone of action were annihilated. His outstanding courage, leadership and devotion to duty were in keeping with the highest traditions of the United States Naval Service.
General Orders: Commanding General, Fleet Marine Force Pacific: Serial 00597
Action Date: 16 September 1944
Service: Marine Corps
Rank: Captain
Company: Company K
Battalion: 3d Battalion
Regiment: 7th Marines
Division: 1st Marine Division.

Legion of Merit
The President of the United States of America takes pleasure in presenting the Legion of Merit with Combat "V" to Colonel Stanley Smith Hughes (MCSN: 0-12654), United States Marine Corps, for exceptionally meritorious conduct in the performance of outstanding services to the Government of the United States with the First Marine Division in connection with military operations against the enemy in the Republic of Vietnam from 8 June 1967 to 22 June 1968. During this period, Colonel Hughes exhibited superior professionalism and dedication in the performance of his demanding duties. Initially serving as Division Inspector, he traveled extensively throughout the Division's Tactical Area of Responsibility to keep abreast of the combat readiness of units and the status of logistical supplies and training programs. With exceptional acuity, he resolved complex problems and assessed the effectiveness with which units performed their assigned missions. Responsible for administering Request Mast as the representative of the Commanding General, he utilized his vast professional experience in meeting the needs of the personnel within the command. He also offered advice and encouragement to less experienced officers who sought to improve their professional ability and develop their leadership potential. Reassigned on 21 January 1968 as Commanding Officer of the First Marines, Colonel Hughes assumed command while the reinforced regiment was engaged in Operation NEOSO II. Directed three days later to displace his regimental headquarters to Phu Bai, he displayed exceptional organization ability in effecting the move on 28 January without the loss of operational effectiveness. After successfully leading his units in three subsequent major operations in the Hue - Phu Bai area, Colonel Hughes moved his regiment into the heavily besieged Khe Sanh Combat Base. Utilizing his headquarters personnel and personnel from various tenant activities to man major portions of the defensive perimeter, he effectively deployed battalion combat elements to the surrounding hills where they continuously sought out the enemy, denying hostile forces the use of terrain used for the employment of mortars, rockets and artillery. Exhibiting a comprehensive knowledge of military tactics, Colonel Hughes fully exploited maximum use of supporting arms fire before launching well coordinated assaults. In addition, through his capable leadership and professionalism, he maintained the tactical integrity of his units by skillful maneuvering and employment of his forces prior to the decisive phase of battle. By his superb professional ability, decisive leadership and steadfast devotion to duty, Colonel Hughes rendered distinguished service to his country and upheld the highest traditions of the Marine Corps and of the United States Naval Service. (Colonel Hughes is authorized to wear the Combat "V".)
Action Date: 8 June 1967 – 22 June 1968
Service: Marine Corps
Rank: Colonel
Company: Commanding Officer
Regiment: 1st Marines
Division: 1st Marine Division (Rein.) FMF.

References

External links
 The Battle For Hue

1918 births
2001 deaths
Recipients of the Navy Cross (United States)
United States Marine Corps personnel of the Vietnam War
People from Elmira, New York
Recipients of the Silver Star
Recipients of the Legion of Merit
United States Marine Corps colonels